Mark Sharp is an American politician serving in the Missouri House of Representatives since 2020, succeeding fellow Democrat DaRon McGee.

Missouri House of Representatives

Committee assignments 
 Crime Prevention
 Elementary and Secondary Education
 General Laws
 Joint Committee on Legislative Research
 Special Committee on Urban Issues

Electoral history

References

21st-century American politicians
Living people
Sharp, Mark
Year of birth missing (living people)